Woe of Tyrants is an American death metal band from Chillicothe, Ohio, which formed in 2004.

History
Woe of Tyrants released their critically acclaimed debut album, Behold the Lion, through Tribunal Records in June 2007, and they were soon in talks with several major players in the independent label market. In October 2007, Woe of Tyrants signed a multi-album deal with Metal Blade Records and immediately began work on what would be their first worldwide release, Kingdom of Might, released in January 2009 and produced by Joey Sturgis.

In 2009, Woe of Tyrants toured with many bands, including Unearth, God Dethroned, Psyopus, Lazarus A.D., and more. They played the main stage at the New England Metal and Hardcore Festival in April, along with the Rock & Shock Festival in October, both at The Palladium in Worcester, MA.

In December 2009, the band headed into The Basement Studios in Winston-Salem, NC with producer Jamie King (Between the Buried and Me, Through the Eyes of the Dead, The Human Abstract) to record their follow up to Kingdom of Might, slated for a spring 2010 release through Metal Blade. The release of their third album coincided with the band’s participation in Overkill’s 25th Anniversary Tour, dubbed "Killfest 2010", also featuring Vader, God Dethroned, Warbringer, and Evile.

Their third studio album, entitled Threnody, was released on April 13, 2010 on Metal Blade. The album was produced by Jamie King.

As of July 8, 2016, the band has begun writing their fourth album.

Discography
Behold the Lion (2007) Tribunal Records
Kingdom of Might (2009) Metal Blade Records
Threnody (2010) Metal Blade Records

Current members
 Chris Catanzaro - vocals
 Tate Matthews - bass
 Matt Kincaid - guitar
 Sebastian Gies - guitar
 Johnny Roberts - drums

Former members
 Adam Kohler - bass
 Chris Burns - guitar
 Fred Russell - guitar
 Joey Rider - guitar
 Dustin Grooms - drums
 Adam Routte - guitar
 Shaun Gunter - bass

References

External links
 
 

American death metal musical groups
Musical quintets
Heavy metal musical groups from Ohio
Musical groups established in 2004
Metal Blade Records artists